The Zboiul is a small left tributary of the river Danube in Romania. It discharges into the Danube just upstream of the confluence of Danube and Argeș, west of Oltenița.

References

Rivers of Romania
Rivers of Giurgiu County
Rivers of Călărași County